St. Lukes Hospital is a private hospital located in Launceston, Tasmania, Australia. St. Luke's was founded in 1900 by the St. Luke's Anglican Association, a charitable organisation, and was designed to be for the care of the aged, disabled, and terminally ill. It was first sold in 1986, and again sold in 2004, this time to Little Company of Mary Health Care, owners of Calvary Hospital.

External links
Calvary Hospital web site

Hospitals in Tasmania
Buildings and structures in Launceston, Tasmania
Hospitals established in 1900
1900 establishments in Australia